The Alexander School was a private college preparation middle and high school (grades 7–12) in Richardson, Texas. Named after Alexander the Great, it was established by David B. Bowlin in 1975. It closed permanently on June 1, 2017.

References

High schools in Dallas County, Texas
High schools in Richardson, Texas
Educational institutions established in 1975
1975 establishments in Texas
Private middle schools in Texas
Private high schools in Texas